Ugo Cappellacci (born 27 November 1960 in Cagliari, Italy) is an Italian Sardinian politician and member of the Forza Italia (FI) political party. Cappellacci, a center-right, politician, was elected President of Sardinia in the 2009 regional election, held in February 2009, with 51.9% of the vote, ousting the incumbent left-wing coalition led by Renato Soru, who garnered 42.89%. He took office as President on 27 February 2009. He lost as incumbent to Francesco Pigliaru of the Democratic Party in the 2014 regional election.

References

1960 births
Living people
Presidents of Sardinia
The People of Freedom politicians
21st-century Italian politicians
Politicians of Sardinia
People from Cagliari
Cappellacci